Luis Miguel López Beltrán (born 11 January 1975) is a Spanish former professional footballer who played as a defender.

Career
López began his career with Valencia. He started off with the club's reserve team in Segunda División B, making one hundred and thirty-eight appearances and scoring twelve goals in four years. On 21 June 1997, López made his professional debut for Valencia's first-team in La Liga, he was subbed on at half-time for Patxi Ferreira in a 3–2 defeat to Espanyol. In 1998, Segunda División B side Levante signed López. He netted two goals in forty-two matches in his opening season, which ended with promotion to the Segunda División. 2000 saw López join fellow second tier outfit Jaén, where he remained for two years and featured seventy-one times.

He departed Jaén in 2003 and subsequently had spells with Segunda División B teams Logroñés, Gimnàstic and Almansa up until 2006. López won promotion with Gimnàstic in 2003–04, but suffered relegation with Almansa in 2005–06. His final senior career club became Ontinyent in 2007, he made his one and only appearance for them on 26 August versus Levante B.

Career statistics
.

Honours
Levante
Segunda División B: 1998–99

References

External links

1975 births
Living people
Footballers from Valencia (city)
Spanish footballers
Association football defenders
Segunda División B players
La Liga players
Segunda División players
Valencia CF Mestalla footballers
Valencia CF players
Levante UD footballers
Real Jaén footballers
Logroñés CF footballers
Gimnàstic de Tarragona footballers
UD Almansa players
Ontinyent CF players